WRRB (96.9 FM) is an alternative rock radio station licensed to Arlington, New York and serving the Mid-Hudson Valley of New York state. The station is owned by Townsquare Media and broadcasts at 310 watts ERP from the Illinois Mountain master tower in Marlborough, New York

Programming
WRRB's programming is simulcast with that of 92.7 WRRV Middletown, New York which serves the lower Hudson Valley, Catskills, Sussex County, New Jersey and Pike County, Pennsylvania. Though on paper WRRV is seen as the primary station, in reality WRRB is the more dominant of the two based on cume and sales (and the fact that, since 2000, the station has been run out of the longtime studios of sister WPDH on Pendell Road in Poughkeepsie). Information on the specifics of WRRV's format can be seen in the article on WRRV.

History
The 96.9 frequency came on the air in Fall 1989 as Bridge Broadcasting-owned WEXT ("Next FM") running a "new adult contemporary" format (a combination of smooth jazz and new-age music). Aside from its licence, WEXT had another first in being the first station operated by a local marketing agreement as WKIP/WRNQ owner Richard Novik later controlled WEXT.

WEXT's format was a bit ahead of its time and though it had a strong start and admiration of music critics and musicophiles, however this critical success did not translate into ratings as "Next FM" was the market's lowest rated FM signal in its only Arbitron ratings book in 1990. Even with the station's poor ratings, it was somehow seen as a threat to the ratings of the more mainstream and successful WRNQ.

To boost WRNQ, Novik flipped WEXT's format to a simulcast of the talk radio format of WKIP in February 1991 as WKIP-FM. Though the two stations split off at points, the simulcast of WKIP came with nearly no measurable ratings on 96.9 and at a financial loss on Novik's end. In August 1993, Novik terminated the LMA with Bridge who on September 1 of that year began an LMA with Woodstock-based WDST, bringing that station's storied Adult Album Alternative format to points south under the calls WDSP.

With a dedicated existing WDST audience on board and a good number of new listeners, WDSP became a middle-of-the pack station overall in the market but with good demographics; this success led Bridge to sell the station to WDST owner CHET-5 Broadcasting in 1994. The station remained moderately successful, however a financial crisis in early 1997 led CHET-5 to sell WDSP and WKNY in Kingston to the Crystal Radio Group in April of that year. Seeing an opportunity to take its WRRV in Middletown to a full-market signal, WDSP flipped to a WRRV simulcast as WRRB which continues to this day.

Townsquare Media
In October 2000, Crystal sold its holdings to Aurora Communications, which a year later was bought out by Cumulus Media. On August 30, 2013, a deal was announced in which Cumulus would swap its stations in Dubuque, Iowa and Poughkeepsie, New York (including WRRB) to Townsquare Media in exchange for Peak Broadcasting's Fresno, California stations. The deal was part of Cumulus' acquisition of Dial Global; Townsquare, Peak, and Dial Global are all controlled by Oaktree Capital Management. The sale to Townsquare was completed on November 14, 2013.

References

External links

WRRV Website

Dutchess County, New York
RRB
Townsquare Media radio stations